The MicroGame line by Metagaming Concepts consisted of tabletop microgames published from 1977 to 1982.

History
In 1977, Metagaming Concepts designer Howard Thompson came up with a new type of small, inexpensive, and fast wargame with a limited number of counters, a small map and a short rulebook, all packaged in a ziplock bag. It initially sold for $2.95, much cheaper than standard-sized boxed wargames of the time. As game historian Shannon Appelcline noted in the 2014 book Designers & Dragons, "The games were quite cheap for the market at the time but nonetheless allowed for a good amount of enjoyment and replayability."

Metagaming Concepts first used the term "MicroGame" when they released Ogre, MicroGame #1 in 1977.

Games
 1: Ogre
 2: Chitin: I
 3: Melee
 4: WarpWar
 5: Rivets
 6: Wizard
 7: Olympica
 8: G.E.V.
 9: Ice War
 10: Black Hole
 11: Sticks & Stones
 12: Invasion of the Air-eaters
 13: Holy War
 14: Annihilator & One World
 15: Hot Spot
 16: Artifact
 17: Dimension Demons
 18: The Lords of Underearth
 19: Helltank
 20: Trailblazer
 21: Starleader: Assault!
 22: Helltank Destroyer

References

Metagaming Concepts games